Novy Kostek is a rural locality (a selo) in Khasavyurtovsky District, Republic of Dagestan, Russia. The population was 4,524 as of 2010. There are 39 streets.

Geography 
Novy Kostek is located 27 km northeast of Khasavyurt (the district's administrative centre) by road. Kostek is the nearest rural locality.

References 

Rural localities in Khasavyurtovsky District